Pericome caudata is a species of flowering plant in the aster family known by the common name mountain tail-leaf. It is native to the southwestern United States as far east as Colorado, Oklahoma, and Texas, as well as northern Mexico, where it grows in rocky habitat, often in hills and mountains, and sometimes in disturbed areas. It is a large, branching, leafy perennial herb or subshrub approaching 2 meters in maximum height. It is glandular, resinous, sparsely hairy, and aromatic. The leaves are somewhat triangular, sometimes with a few large teeth or sharp lobes, the blade measuring up to 12 centimeters long and borne on a petiole. The leaf size and shape is variable across the species' range. The inflorescence is a cluster of many flower heads each under a centimeter wide and filled with golden yellow disc florets. The Navajo used this plant for a variety of medicinal and ceremonial purposes.

References

External links
Jepson Manual Treatment
USDA Plants Profile
Photo gallery

Perityleae
Plants used in traditional Native American medicine